Ebrahimabad-e Dasht Bar (also Romanized as Ebrāhīmābād-e Dasht Bar; also known as Ebrāhīmābād, Ebrahim Abad Arzoo’eyeh, and Ebrāhīmābād-e Arzū’īyeh) is a village in Vakilabad Rural District, in the Central District of Arzuiyeh County, Kerman Province, Iran. In 2006, according to census, its population totaled 47 individuals. The census also revealed a total of 14 families.

References 

Populated places in Arzuiyeh County